Robin Just (born 13 November 1987) is a Slovak professional ice hockey player who played with HC Slovan Bratislava in the Slovak Extraliga, and for five clubs in Germany.

References

External links

Living people
HC Slovan Bratislava players
1987 births
Slovak ice hockey left wingers
Ice hockey people from Bratislava
Hannover Scorpions players
Ravensburg Towerstars players
Hannover Indians players
Schwenninger Wild Wings players
SC Bietigheim-Bissingen players
Slovak expatriate ice hockey players in Germany
Naturalized citizens of Germany